Between the Lies is the second EP by American metalcore band Memphis May Fire. It was released on November 2, 2010 through Bullet Tooth Records.

Track listing
All lyrics written by Matty Mullins, all music composed by Kellen McGregor and Memphis May Fire

Personnel
Memphis May Fire
 Matty Mullins – lead vocals, keyboards
 Kellen McGregor – lead guitar, backing vocals
 Ryan Bentley – rhythm guitar
 Cory Elder – bass
 Eric Molesworth – drums

Production
 Produced, mastered and mixed by Kellen McGregor
 Engineered by Kellen McGregor and Ryan Bentley
 Management by Jerry Clubb and Jim Present (Ricochet Management)
 Photography by Evan Dell

References

External links
Memphis May Fire on Myspace

2010 EPs
Memphis May Fire albums